Sibamoni Bora (born 1 January 1963) is an Indian politician; a member of Indian National Congress from Assam. She is an MLA, elected from the Batadroba constituency in the 2021 Assam Legislative Assembly election.

Early life and education 
Bora is the daughter of former MLA of Batadroba, Kiran Bora. She has a M.Sc from Gauhati University in 1982, and a B.Sc from Nowgong College in 1980. She is also the daughter in law of former Chief Minister Golap Borbora.

Political career 
In the 2021 Assam Legislative Assembly election, Bora was the Indian National Congress candidate for Batadroba, the same constituency her father had previously represented. She received 84278 votes, 60.02% of the total vote. She defeated the incumbent MLA, Angoorlata Deka, by 32820 votes.

References 

Indian National Congress politicians from Assam
Assam MLAs 2021–2026
Living people
People from Nagaon district
1963 births